Andre Agassi was the defending champion but did not compete that year.

Tommy Haas won in the final 6–3, 6–4 against Andy Roddick.

Seeds
A champion seed is indicated in bold text while text in italics indicates the round in which that seed was eliminated.

  Andy Roddick (final)
  Mardy Fish (first round)
  Taylor Dent (first round)
  James Blake (quarterfinals)
  Andrei Pavel (semifinals)
  Robby Ginepri (first round)
  Luis Horna (semifinals)
  Jürgen Melzer (quarterfinals)

Draw

References
 2004 U.S. Men's Clay Court Championships Draw

2004 Singles
Singles